The Billie Holiday Theatre is as 218-seat theatre located in the New York neighborhood of Bedford-Stuyvesant, Brooklyn.  It opened in May 1972,  It was founded by the Bedford-Stuyvesant Restoration Corporation.

The Billie Holiday Theatre is a nonprofit organization located at 1368 Fulton Street, inside the Bedford Stuyvesant Restoration Corporation's Restoration Plaza, and is part of a $6 million  superblock in Bedford-Stuyvesant eventually housing an ice-skating rink, a supermarket, and the theatre.

Theatre background
Franklin A. Thomas, the first Black President of the Ford Foundation, used his position to revitalize his hometown neighborhood of Bedford-Stuyvesant through the Bedford-Stuyvesant Restoration  Corporation. The $6 million unit housed the 218-seat Billie Holiday Theatre. Thomas’ concept behind the theatre was “to expose the second largest black community in America to the arts while providing an outlet for local talent.”  Marjorie Moon was appointed as the theatre's executive director. Under Moon, “the theatre built a community audience by placing Bedford Stuyvesant citizens on the theatre’s board.” 

In 2015, the theater moved to Fort Greene for two years while the Bedford-Stuyvesant location was being renovated. The renovations to The Billie Holiday Theatre were designed by MBB Architects. The newly renovated theater reopened in May 2017.

Notable alumni
Well-known theatre actors who have performed at the Billie Holiday Theatre include Samm-Art Williams, Samuel L. Jackson, Debbie Allen, Tichina Arnold, Obba Babatunde, and Rondell Sheridan

Notable works
Young Gifted and Broke (1977) by Weldon Irvine ran for a record seventy-seven sold-out performances.

In 2010 the theatre presented the award-winning play, What Would Jesus Do?.

References

Theatres in Brooklyn